The February 2001 El Salvador earthquake occurred with a moment magnitude of 6.6 on 13 February at 14:22:05 UTC. The epicentre was 15 miles (30 km) E of San Salvador, El Salvador. At least 315 people were killed, 3,399 were injured, and extensive damage affected the area. Another 16,752 homes were damaged and 44,759 destroyed.  The most severe damage occurred in the San Juan Tepezontes-San Vicente-Cojutepeque area, though it was felt throughout the country and in neighboring Guatemala and Honduras. Landslides occurred in many areas of El Salvador.

Tectonic setting
El Salvador lies above the convergent boundary where oceanic crust of the Cocos Plate is being subducted beneath the Caribbean Plate at rate of about 72 mm per year along the Middle America Trench. This boundary is associated with earthquakes resulting from movement on the plate interface itself, such as the  7.7 1992 Nicaragua earthquake, and from faulting within both the overriding Caribbean Plate associated with the active volcanic belt, such as the destructive 1936 San Salvador earthquake, and the subducting Cocos Plate, such as the 1982 El Salvador earthquake.

Earthquake
The focal mechanism and depth of the earthquake are consistent with shallow strike-slip faulting in the Caribbean Plate, along the line of the active volcanic belt. The fault trend is confirmed by the distribution of aftershocks. Despite its magnitude and shallow focus, there are no indications of surface rupture for this earthquake.

The earthquake occurred almost exactly a month after the major earthquake in January that affected the same area of the country. It remains unclear whether or not the two events are related in any way. Some previous earthquakes that were associated with the subduction zone were followed within a few years by shallow events. Examples include shallow earthquakes in 1917 and 1919 following a subduction event in 1915, and the shallow earthquake in 1936 following a subduction event in 1932.

Damage
The January earthquake had already caused considerable damage to buildings and left many people homeless. It had also triggered many landslides that were highly destructive. The February earthquake reactivated some of these landslides but also triggered new ones. 275,013 people were affected by the February earthquake of whom 315 died and a further 3,399 were injured. The majority of the casualties were in the departments of Cuscatlán (165 dead, 1,372 injured), San Vicente (87 dead, 1,220 injured) and La Paz (58 dead, 806 injured). A total of 44,750 houses were destroyed and a further 16,752 houses, 83 public buildings, 111 schools, 97 churches 5 hospitals and 36 other health facilities were damaged.

See also
List of earthquakes in 2001
List of earthquakes in El Salvador

References

 
 

El Salvador 2001, 02
2001, 02
2001, 02
Earthquake 02
Earthquake 02
El Salvador earthquake